The CFL was officially formed in 1958.  Statistics for the IRFU/Eastern Division date back to 1954 whereas WIFU/Western Division statistics date back to 1950.

See also
List of Canadian Football League annual passing leaders
List of Canadian Football League annual receiving leaders

References

Rushing, annual